Petit Griffon De Gascogne may refer to:

Basset Bleu de Gascogne, a small hound but not a Griffon hound 
Griffon Bleu de Gascogne, a coarse-haired, medium-sized hound
Petit bleu de Gascogne, a medium-large hound for hunting small game, but not a Griffon hound